Swachh Bharat Mission (SBM), Swachh Bharat Abhiyan, or Clean India Mission is a country-wide campaign initiated by the Government of India in 2014 to eliminate open defecation and improve solid waste management. It is a restructured version of the Nirmal Bharat Abhiyan launched in 2009 that failed to achieve its intended targets.

Phase 1 of the Swachh Bharat Mission lasted till October 2019.

Phase 2 is being implemented between 2020–21 and 2024–25 to help cement the work of Phase 1.

Initiated by the Government of India, the mission aimed to achieve an "open-defecation free" (ODF) India by 2 October 2019, the 150th anniversary of the birth of Mahatma Gandhi through construction of toilets. An estimated 89.9 million toilets were built in the period. The objectives of the first phase of the mission also included eradication of manual scavenging, generating awareness and bringing about a behavior change regarding sanitation practices, and augmentation of capacity at the local level.

The second phase of the mission aims to sustain the open defecation free status and improve the management of solid and liquid waste, while also working to improve the lives of sanitation workers. The mission is aimed at progressing towards target 6.2 of the Sustainable Development Goals Number 6 established by the United Nations in 2015.

The campaign's official name is in Hindi. In English, it translates to "Clean India Mission". The campaign was officially launched on 2 October 2014 at Rajghat, New Delhi by Prime Minister Narendra Modi. It is India's largest cleanliness drive to date with three million government employees and students from all parts of India participating in 4,043 cities, towns, and rural communities.

At a rally in Champaran, the Prime Minister called the campaign Satyagrah se Swatchhagrah in reference to Gandhi's Champaran Satyagraha launched on 10 April 1916.

The mission was split into two: rural and urban. In rural areas "SBM - Gramin" was financed and monitored through the Ministry of Drinking Water and Sanitation (since converted to the Department of Drinking Water and Sanitation under the Ministry of Jal Shakti) whereas "SBM - urban" was overseen by the Ministry of Housing and Urban Affairs.

As part of the campaign, volunteers, known as Swatchhagrahis, or "Ambassadors of cleanliness", promoted the construction of toilets using a popular method called Community-Led Total Sanitation at the village level. Other activities included national real-time monitoring and updates from non-governmental organizations such as The Ugly Indian, Waste Warriors, and SWACH Pune (Solid Waste Collection and Handling).

The government provided subsidy for construction of nearly 90 million toilets between 2014 and 2019, although some Indians especially in rural areas choose to not use them. The campaign was criticized for using coercive approaches to force people to use toilets. Some people were stopped from defecating in open and threatened with withdrawal from government benefits.
The campaign was financed by the Government of India and state governments. The former released $5.8 billion (Rs 40,700 crore) of funds for toilet construction in 700,000 villages. The total budget for the rural and urban components was estimated at $28 billion, of which 93 percent was for construction, with the rest being allocated for  behavior change campaigns and administration.

Background

In 2011, the Census revealed that sanitation coverage as measured by the number of households owning toilets was just 34 per cent in rural India. An estimated 600 million people defecated in the open, the highest of any country in the world. Coverage about open defecation and contamination of drinking and bathing water in India prompted the government to take measures to deal with the problem.

Previous sanitation campaigns
The first formal sanitation programme was first launched in 1954, followed by Central Rural Sanitation Programme in 1986. These were construction-led and achieved very little. The Total Sanitation Campaign (TSC) was started in 1999 and Nirmal Bharat Abhiyan in 2012 to generate demand for sanitation, linked to subsidy payments for the construction of toilets by families living below the poverty line.

A limited randomized study of eighty villages in rural (Madhya Pradesh) showed that the TSC programme did modestly increase the number of households with latrines, and had a small effect in reducing open defecation. Of the 138.2 million rural households in India (a 2001 figure), nearly 3.5 million constructed toilets. However, there was no improvement in the health of children." The earlier "Nirmal Bharat Abhiyan" rural sanitation program was hampered by the unrealistic approach. Consequently, Nirmal Bharat Abhiyan was restructured by Cabinet approval on 24 September 2014 as Swachh Bharat Abhiyan.

The rural household toilet coverage in India increased from 1% in 1981 to 11% in 1991, to 22% in 2001, to 32.7% in 2011. The National Annual Rural Sanitation Survey of India reported that 96.5% of rural households in India had toilets. in a 2019-2020 report the number was reduced to 1.4% or 19 million. Since 2014, the Government of India, has made remarkable strides in reaching the Open Defecation Free targets. 36 states and union territories, 706 districts and over 603,175 villages have been declared open defecation free as of Jan 2020.  India has constructed an impressive number of toilets under SBM in just five years. 

Where it achieved a measure of success, SBM built on the earlier sanitation programmes. It refined their approaches and templatised the action plan for districts. From the early 2010s, several district collectors and magistrates from West Bengal to Rajasthan experimented with different methods to engage local people and panchayats in community mobilisation. They selected swachhagrahis, trained them and released them for campaigns on a schedule. They were paid from sanitation funds. In states with strong panchayats these measures bore fruit and the gains of sanitation, that is toilet construction, were backed by usage. In other states, little was achieved beyond toilet construction.

Structure

Components
The core objectives of the first phase of the mission were to reduce open defecation and improve management of municipal solid waste in both urban and rural areas. Elimination of open defecation was to be achieved through construction of individual household level toilets (often twin pit pour flush pit latrines), toilets and public toilets. For improving solid waste management, cities were encouraged to prepare detailed project reports that are bankable and have a financial model.

The second phase on the other hand focuses on sustaining gains of the first phase and improving management of the solid and liquid wastes.

Finance
SBM was budgeted at $28 billion. The World Bank provided a  loan and $25 million in technical assistance in 2015 for the Swachh Bharat Mission to support India's universal sanitation initiation. This was to be released in installments subject to checks by an independent verification agency but till January 2017, no funds has been disbursed. The programme has also received funds and technical support from several international organizations and private companies as part of corporate social responsibility initiatives, and the Sarva Shiksha Abhiyan and Rashtriya Madhyamik Shiksha Abhiyan schemes.

Promotional campaigns

Selected public figures and brand ambassadors

Other notable activities

 Anushka Sharma and the Vice President of India M V Naidu picked up a broom to help clean the cyclone-hit port city of Visakhapatnam, in the southern state of Andhra Pradesh, as part of the cleanliness campaign.
 Prime Minister Modi nominated a number of organizations in October 2014 to be "brand ambassadors", including the Institute of Chartered Accountants of India, Eenadu and India Today as well as the dabbawala of Mumbai, who deliver home-made food to hundreds of thousands of people in the city. More than 3 million government employees and school and college students participated in the drive on the occasion.
 A Swachh Bharat Run, attended by 1,500 runners, was organized at the Rashtrapati Bhavan on 2 October 2014.
 Kunwar Bai Yadav lived in a village in Dhamtari district and sold seven of her goats to raise the money to build a toilet at her house at age 106 in 2016. She was declared a mascot of the campaign and visited by Prime Minister Narendra Modi.
 Inspired by the Clean India Mission, a robot named Swachh Bot was built by a maker community in Chennai to clean the wastes on Besant Nagar beach.
 Ravindra Kumar, an IAS officer of Uttar Pradesh cadre who first conquered Mount Everest in 2013, scaled the world's highest peak again on May 23, 2019, dedicated to Swachh Ganga Swachh Bharat Everest Abhiyaan. Kumar said he scaled the mountain to give a call to people of India from the top of the world towards the urgent need of controlling water pollution, saving rivers and other sources of water and ensuring availability of clean water to all.
 Baranagore Ramakrishna Mission Ashrama High School arranged an intensive cleaning programme Swachh Bharat Mission in Baranagar on 30 June 2016, in accordance with the instruction given by the headquarters Belur Math. More than 600 students of standards VIII, IX and X actively participated in the programme under the guidance of monastic members and brahmacharies of the Ashrama and almost all the teaching and non-teaching staff of the high school.

Planned initiatives

The Government appointed CPWD with the responsibility to dispose of waste from Government offices. The Ministry of Railways planned to have the facility of cleaning on demand, clean bed-rolls from automatic laundries, bio-toilets, dustbins in all non-AC coaches. The Swachh Bharat Swachh Vidyalaya campaign was launched by the Minister of Human Resource Development, Government of India by participating in the cleanliness drive along with the school's teachers and students.

Performance monitoring

Swachh Bharat Mission (SBM) Mobile app is being used by people and Government organisations for achieving the goals of Swachh Bharat Mission. For this the government of India is bringing awareness to the people through advertisements.

In 2017, the national sanitation coverage rose to 65% from 38.7% on Oct 2, 2014 before the start of the campaign. It was 90% in August 2018. 35 states/Union Territories, 699 districts and 5.99lakh (599,000) villages were declared Open Defecation Free (ODF) by 25 September 2019.

The cities and towns which have been declared ODF stood at 22 percent and the urban wards which have achieved 100 percent door-to-door solid waste collection stood at 50 percent. The number of Swachhagrahi volunteers working across urban local bodies rose to 20,000, and those working in rural India rose to more than a 100,000. The number of schools with separate toilet facilities for girls rose from 0.4 million (37 percent) to almost one million (91 percent).

Swachh Survekshan annual cleanliness survey

Swachh Survekshan, commissioned by Ministry of Urban Development and carried out by Quality Council of India, is an extensive sanitation survey across several hundred cities to check the progress and impact of Swachh Bharat Abhiyan and to foster a spirit of competition among the cities. The performance of each city is evaluated on six parameters:
Municipal solid waste, sweeping, collection and transportation
 Municipal solid waste, processing, and disposal of solid waste
Open defecation free and toilets
Capacity building and eLearning
 Provision of public toilets and community toilets
 Information, education and communication, and behavior change

Impacts

According to the dashboards maintained by respective ministries, more than 100 million individual household level toilets have been constructed in rural areas, and 6 million household toilets in urban areas. In addition, nearly 6 million community and public toilets have also been constructed in the urban areas. Consequently, 4,234 cities and more than 600,000 villages across the country have declared themselves open defecation free (ODF).

More than 81.5 thousand wards in urban areas now have 100% door to door collection of solid waste and nearly 65 thousand wards practice 100% segregation of waste at source. Of the nearly 150 thousand metric tonnes of solid waste generated in urban areas, 65% is being processed.

An independent survey released by Quality Council of India in August 2017, reported that overall national rural "household access to toilet" coverage increased to 62.5%, and usage of toilets to 91.3%. Haryana topped the national ranking with 99% of households in rural areas covered and usage of toilets at 100%. According to UNICEF, the number of people without a toilet reduced from 550 million to 50 million. The World Bank reports that 96% of Indians who have a toilet use it. The World Health Organization (WHO) has in its report stated that at least 180,000 diarrhoeal deaths were averted in rural India since the launch of the Swachh Bharat Mission. According to a survey carried out in 2018 and published in 2019 by National Statistical Office (NSO), 71% of rural households had access to toilets as of 2018. Though this disagreed with the Indian government's claim in 2019 that 95% of rural households had access to toilets, NSO's numbers still indicated a significant improvement over the situation during the previous survey period in 2012, when only 40% of rural households had access to toilets.

A study by Ashoka University concluded that the construction of toilets under the program led to a reduction in incidence of sexual assault against women.

Data from the National Family Health Surveys (NFHS) demonstrate the increase in access to improved sanitation due to SBM. Post 2015, 3.4% households gained access to better sanitation as compared to just 1.5% earlier

Reception
The mission is noted as the world's largest sanitation program.  It claimed to have provided millions of people access to toilet and brought about a change of behavior towards its usage. Many argue that it has not really eliminated open defecation as rapidly as the government claims. However, It significantly did accelerate the pace of decline in open defecation.

Political sponsorship 
The SBM received political sponsorship from Prime Minister Modi who started talking about sanitation even before he was elected as the Prime Minister. He made a call to address the issue in his first address to the nation on the occasion of Independence day in 2014. Throughout the mission period, he continued to promote the mission through his speeches and was seen wielding the broom multiple times to clean the streets. In 2019, he plogged on a beach in Mamallapuram during his morning walk; he was there to attend the informal summit with Xi Jinping, then-General Secretary of the Chinese Communist Party.  Other political leaders and public figures including actors and actresses, sports men and women, owners of large business houses were roped in as ambassadors to promote the mission.

Allocation of funds 
Constructing toilets became the mission's singular focus, even though the core objectives were elimination of open defecation and improving solid waste management. Funds for solid waste management under the mission were diverted towards toilet construction.  Allocations for other sectors were also drastically reduced. Though behavioral change is one of the goals of the mission, only 1% of the mission's outlay was spent on education and awareness. Most of the allocation for the category, “information, education and communication”, that was to be used for awareness generation was spent towards print, radio and television advertisements.  No part of the Central Government's allocation was spent on awareness generation at the grass roots.

Target driven approach 
The mission was implemented with a target driven approach; villages, districts, towns and cities and even states declared themselves open defecation free (ODF) based on achievement of construction targets.

The SBM has also been criticized for being subsidy-driven rather than community-driven.

Inappropriate containment system 
For lack of sewerage systems, most of the toilets constructed under the mission rely on single pit or twin pits or septic systems for containment of faecal sludge. However, their appropriateness for the local context was not considered in the haste of achieving construction targets. For example, most of the 7.85 million toilets constructed at an estimated cost of INR 94,205 million in the 15 extreme flood-prone districts of Northern Bihar become unusable during the annual floods. Besides the toilet itself being inaccessible, the containment structure is also inundated with flood waters making it unusable.

The SBM does not even acknowledge the issues of the existing sewerage systems and the deaths of numerous sanitation workers caused in cleaning them.

Survey results 
Even though elimination of open defecation was the core objective of the mission, it was never monitored by either of the Ministries. They both kept a track of toilets constructed and funds spent. Therefore, the reality reported by independent surveys was very different from that reported by Government sponsored surveys. Researchers found divergence between findings of the National Family Health Survey (NFHS) and National Annual Rural Sanitation Survey (NARSS); both conducted by the Government only a few months apart.

Interconnected challenges 
By adding millions of on-site sanitation systems and not considering fecal sludge management, it will further add to pollution of the rivers in India.

There is skepticism about the success of SBM which relates to sanitation workers. The people who make India clean, the sanitation workers, remain "invisible in the participation, process or consequences of this national level movement". In 2015, one year after the launch of the program, hundreds of thousands of Indian people were still employed as manual scavengers in emptying bucket toilets and pit latrines. Many continue to work on contractual arrangements without safety of their job and benefits that would accrue from a government job. The SBM has instead burdened the contractual sanitation workers to keep public places clean while keeping it voluntary for the public to deface public places by urinating, defecating or littering them.

A report by WSSCC in 2019 found that the impact of the SBM for the most vulnerable was limited. The report stated that "Barriers due to physical disabilities, social/economic disparities, geography, sexual orientation, gender and caste were not addressed."

Delhi's three municipal corporations identified 543 road dust hotspots in November 2022, using mechanized road sweepers and water sprinklers to reduce dust. They submitted reports on air pollution mitigation measures to the Delhi government's green war room.</ref></ref>

Irregularities with regards to the funds have been reported. In Odisha hundreds of beneficiaries have filed complaints that money has been siphoned off without constructing the toilets. In Madhya Pradesh almost half a million Swachh Bharta toilets have "vanished" in a multi billion rupees scam. In Bihar crores of rupees meant for Swachh Bharat Mission were siphoned off by Government officials in collusion with banks Police complaints were filed against those who have misused Swachh Bharat funds for personal household expenses.

See also 

 Community-led total sanitation
 Digital India
 Electronic toilet
 India.gov.in
 List of cleanest cities in India
 List of cleanest railway stations in India
 Toilet: Ek Prem Katha, a feature film
 Water supply and sanitation in India

References

External links

 

2014 establishments in India
Government schemes in India
Indian missions
Modi administration initiatives
Sanitation
Water supply and sanitation in India